During the Cold War every London Borough was obliged to have a Civil Defence centre. These were controversial structures as it was widely believed that planning for the aftermath of nuclear war was both expensive and pointless.

The area of London (extending outwards to the then boundary of the Metropolitan Police District and thus including some areas outside the modern Greater London) was designated Region 5 and had its regional seat of government in a re-used radar station at Kelvedon Hatch in Essex. Below this level it was split into five groups – North, North East, North West, South East and South West. Each group had a control centre. Below this each borough had one as well.

List of civil defence centres in London

North Group
Not allocated

North East Group
Northumberland Avenue, Wanstead group control

North West Group
Beatrice Road, Southall group control

South East Group
Pear Tree House group control

South West Group
Church Hill Road, Cheam group control

See also
 Military citadels under London
 Subterranean London

External links 
 London Civil Defence Controls

20th century in London
Infrastructure in London
Subterranean London
Emergency management in the United Kingdom